Sheikh Chilli may refer to:

 Sheikh Chilli (Sufi saint) (died 1650), Indian Sufi saint
 Sheikh Chilli (film), a 1942 Indian Hindi-language film

See also 
 Sheikh Chilli's Tomb, a complex of structures in Thanesar, Haryana, India